The Agriculture and Farmers' Welfare Department of State of Tamil Nadu is one of the Department of Government of Tamil Nadu

Sub - Departments

Undertakings & Bodies

Former Ministers for Agriculture 
 1990 – 1991:
Veerapandy S.Arumugam
 1991 – 1996:
Ku. Pa. Krishnan
 1996 - 2001:
Veerapandy S. Arumugam
 2006 - 2011:
Veerapandy S. Arumugam
 2011 – 2012:
K. A. Sengottaiyan
 2012 – 2014:
S. Damodaran
 2014 – 2016:
R. Vaithilingam
 2017 - 2020:
R. Doraikannu
 2021 - present:
M. R. K. Panneerselvam

See also 
 Government of Tamil Nadu
 Tamil Nadu Government's Departments
 Ministry of Agriculture (India)
 Department of Finance (Kerala)

References

External links
 http://www.tn.gov.in/departments/agri.html (Official Website of the Agriculture Department, Tamil Nadu)
 http://www.tn.gov.in (Official website of Government of Tamil Nadu)

Tamil Nadu state government departments
Agriculture in Tamil Nadu
Tamil Nadu